Canadienne cattle, also known as Black Canadienne, French Canadienne, and Black Jersey, are the only breed of dairy cattle developed in Canada. They originated in the 16th century, when French settlers brought cattle over for foundation stock to settle Canada. The Canadienne were the most common breed of domestic cattle in Canada until the late 19th century, when other breeds began to displace them. Today, the Hereford and Holstein have become the most common types of cattle in Canada. The Canadienne, though still found on farms and ranches across the nation, is now comparatively rare except in certain areas of the province of Quebec. Efforts by an active breed society and the Quebec government have been made in recent years to preserve the breed from extinction.

History
The Canadienne breed can be traced back to cattle in present-day Quebec that came from the Normandy and Brittany regions of France in the 1600s. The breeds that came in are unknown; the melting-pot effect took over until the breed took on its own appearance and type. It is believed that Canadienne cattle come from the same general ancestry as Guernsey, Jersey and Kerry cattle. They developed into a hardy, compact dairy breed that could survive the harsh environment of Quebec. The cattle also provided draught work and meat, which was important to the colonists.

In 1850, the Canadian Parliament discovered that the vast majority of cattle in Quebec were Canadienne, so they began to discourage its breeding and soon the breed received competition from other breeds. In 1886, a couple of men created a herd book; the French Canadian Cattle Breeder's Association was formed in 1895 to prevent the breed from becoming extinct. The breed later gained recognition in 1901 for being the most profitable dairy breed in the Pan-American show in Buffalo, New York.

In the early 1970s, the Ministry of Agriculture became concerned about inbreeding within the Canadienne breed and the lack of improvement in milk production, so they introduced Brown Swiss genetics. The use of Brown Swiss genetics was uncontrolled and had to be stopped to preserve the purity of Canadienne cattle. In 1999, the Canadienne cow was given official heritage status by the Government of Quebec and its breeding program is supported to preserve the breed.

Uses
The main use of Canadienne cattle is for milk production. They are efficient milk producers; their milk contains high levels of butterfat and protein, making it an excellent choice for cheese production. They have also been raised for meat production; meat produced by these animals tends to be lean.

Their hardiness and quiet nature made them good animals to use for farmwork.

Characteristics
The Canadienne breed is small to medium-sized; cows weigh between 400 and 500 kg and bulls weigh on average 800 kg. This breed has been developed to survive in the harsh Canadian environment. Their small size makes this breed an excellent candidate for intensive pasture management as well as it allows for the animals to remain on pasture for longer periods of time in early spring and late fall because their light weight does not cause as much damage to the soil compared to heavier breeds. If horns are present, they will be long and upturned with darker coloured tips.

Most cattle have black, brown or russet coats with a lighter coloured topline, udder and muzzle; shades varying between black and brown comprise the colouring for other parts of their bodies. When calves are first born they have light coat colours, and following 4 months of age coat colouration, the colour becomes permanently established.

Associations and breed societies
 Canadienne Cattle Breeders Association
 The Association for the Development of the Canadienne Cattle Breed in Charlevoix

See also

 Hays Converter
 Canadian Speckle Park

References

Genetic Diversity among Canadienne, Brown Swiss, Holstein and Jersey cattle based on mitochondrial D-loop sequence variation
Association de mise en valeur des bovins de race canadienne
Beyond Factory Farming
Breeds of Livestock 
Canadian Farm Animal Genetic Resources Foundation Retrieved 2009-11-08

Dairy cattle breeds
Cattle breeds originating in Canada
Conservation Priority Breeds of the Livestock Conservancy
Cattle breeds